In abstract algebra, a decomposition of a module is a way to write a module as a direct sum of modules. A type of a decomposition is often used to define or characterize modules: for example, a semisimple module is a module that has a decomposition into simple modules. Given a ring, the types of decomposition of modules over the ring can also be used to define or characterize the ring: a ring is semisimple if and only if every module over it is a semisimple module.

An indecomposable module is a module that is not a direct sum of two nonzero submodules. Azumaya's theorem states that if a module has an decomposition into modules with local endomorphism rings, then all decompositions into indecomposable modules are equivalent to each other; a special case of this, especially in group theory, is known as the Krull–Schmidt theorem.

A special case of a decomposition of a module is a decomposition of a ring: for example, a ring is semisimple if and only if it is a direct sum (in fact a product) of matrix rings over division rings (this observation is known as the Artin–Wedderburn theorem).

Idempotents and decompositions 

To give a direct sum decomposition of a module into submodules is the same as to give orthogonal idempotents in the endomorphism ring of the module that sum up to the identity map. Indeed, if , then, for each , the linear endomorphism  given by the natural projection followed by the natural inclusion is an idempotent. They are clearly orthogonal to each other ( for ) and they sum up to the identity map:

as endomorphisms (here the summation is well-defined since it is a finite sum at each element of the module).

This fact already puts some constraints on a possible decomposition of a ring: given a ring , suppose there is a decomposition

The summation of idempotent endomorphisms corresponds to the decomposition of the unity of R: , which is necessarily a finite sum; in particular,  must be a finite set.

Let R be a ring. Suppose there is a (necessarily finite) decomposition of it as a left module over itself

into two-sided ideals  of R. As above,  for some orthogonal idempotents  such that . Then, for each i,

Clearly, the argument can be reversed and so there is a one-to-one correspondence between the direct sum decomposition into ideals and the orthogonal central idempotents summing up to the unity 1.

For example, again take . This ring is a simple ring; in particular, it has no nontrivial decomposition into two-sided ideals.

Types of decomposition 
There are several types of direct sum decompositions that have been studied:
Semisimple decomposition: a direct sum of simple modules.
Indecomposable decomposition: a direct sum of indecomposable modules.
A decomposition with local endomorphism rings (cf. #Azumaya's theorem): a direct sum of modules whose endomorphism rings are local rings (a ring is local if for each element x, either x or 1 − x is a unit).
Serial decomposition: a direct sum of uniserial modules (a module is uniserial if the lattice of submodules is a finite chain).

Since a simple module is indecomposable, a semisimple decomposition is an indecomposable decomposition (but not conversely). If the endomorphism ring of a module is local, then, in particular, it cannot have a nontrivial idempotent: the module is indecomposable. Thus, a decomposition with local endomorphism rings is an indecomposable decomposition.

A direct summand is said to be maximal if it admits an indecomposable complement. A decomposition  is said to complement maximal direct summands if for each maximal direct summand L of M, there exists a subset  such that 
 

Two decompositions  are said to be equivalent if there is a bijection  such that for each , . If a module admits an indecomposable decomposition complementing maximal direct summands, then any two indecomposable decompositions of the module are equivalent.

Azumaya's theorem 

In the simplest form, Azumaya's theorem states: given a decomposition  such that the endomorphism ring of each  is local (so the decomposition is indecomposable), each indecomposable decomposition of M is equivalent to this given decomposition. The more precise version of the theorem states: still given such a decomposition, if , then
 if nonzero, N contains an indecomposable direct summand,

The endomorphism ring of an indecomposable module of finite length is local (e.g., by Fitting's lemma) and thus Azumaya's theorem applies to the setup of the Krull–Schmidt theorem. Indeed, if M is a module of finite length, then, by induction on length, it has a finite indecomposable decomposition , which is a decomposition with local endomorphism rings. Now, suppose we are given an indecomposable decomposition . Then, since  is indecomposable,  and so on; i.e., complements to each sum  can be taken to be direct sums of some 's.

Another application is the following statement (which is a key step in the proof of Kaplansky's theorem on projective modules):
To see this, choose a finite set  such that .

(In a sense, this is an extension of Kaplansky's theorem and is proved by the two lemmas used in the proof of the theorem.)

Decomposition of a ring 
On the decomposition of a ring, the most basic but still important observation, known as the Artin–Wedderburn theorem is this: given a ring R, the following are equivalent:
 R is a semisimple ring; i.e.,  is a semisimple left module.
  where  denotes the ring of n-by-n matrices and the positive integers  are determined by R (but the s are not determined by R).
 Every left module over R is semisimple.

To see the equivalence of the first two, note: if  where  are mutually non-isomorphic left minimal ideals, then, with the view that endomorphisms act from the right,

where each  can be viewed as the matrix ring over the division ring . (The converse is because the decomposition of 2. is equivalent to a decomposition into minimal left ideals = simple left submodules.) The equivalence 1.  3. is because every module is a quotient of a free module and a quotient of a semisimple module is clearly semisimple.

See also 
Pure-injective module

Notes

References 
 
 Frank W. Anderson, Lectures on Non-Commutative Rings, University of Oregon, Fall, 2002.
 
 
 Y. Lam, Bass’s work in ring theory and projective modules [MR 1732042]
 
 R. Warfield: Exchange rings and decompositions of modules, Math. Annalen 199(1972), 31-36.

Module theory